Wallingford was a constituency in the House of Commons of the Parliament of the United Kingdom.

It was a parliamentary borough created in 1295, centred on the market town Wallingford in Berkshire (now in Oxfordshire). It used to return two Members of Parliament (MPs) to the House of Commons; this was cut to one in 1832, and the constituency was abolished in 1885. The town of Wallingford is now within the constituency of Wantage.

History
Before 1832 the borough consisted only of the town of Wallingford, which by the 19th century was divided into four parishes. The franchise was limited to (male) inhabitants paying scot and lot, a local tax. Namier and Brooke estimated that the number of electors in the mid-18th century was about 200; but the number fluctuated considerably with the fortunes of the town, which had no manufacturing interests and considerable unemployment at some periods. There were never enough voters to avoid the risk of corruption, and systematic bribery generally prevailed, with anything up to 150 votes being bought and sold at any one election. (In 1754, Thomas Sewell, one of the Whig candidates, spent over £1000 of his own money and not only was this reimbursed from the "secret service" funds but the government spent further money unsuccessfully attempting to secure him a seat in Wallingford.) By the 19th century Wallingford was regarded as one of the worst of the rotten boroughs, and Oldfield recorded in 1816 that the price of a vote was 40 guineas.

The 1831 census found the borough had a population of about 2,500, and 485 houses. Under the Reform Act 1832, the constituency was allowed to survive and to keep one of its two MPs, but the boundaries were considerably extended, taking in the Wallingford Castle precincts, which had previously been excluded, and all or part of a dozen neighbouring parishes including Benson and Crowmarsh, and part of Cholsey. This change of boundaries almost trebled the population, but the effect on the electorate was much smaller. According to the reports on which the Reform Act was based, Wallingford had about 300 men qualified to vote in 1831 (though no more than 230 had ever voted in the previous thirty years). Yet despite the widening of the right to vote, which preserved the ancient right voters of the borough while adding new electors on an occupation franchise, there were only 453 names on the 1832 electoral register for the extended borough. (Stooks Smith records that 166 of these claimed their vote as scot and lot payers, while 287 qualified as £10 occupiers; but many of the latter group presumably paid scot and lot within the old boundaries and could have voted before the Reform Act.)

In 1868 the franchise was further extended and there were 942 registered electors, but the constituency was much too small to survive the Third Reform Act, and was abolished with effect from the general election of 1885. The constituency was mostly included in the new Berkshire North or Abingdon county constituency, but Benson and the other parts of the extended borough on the Oxfordshire side of the Thames were placed in the Oxfordshire South or Henley division of that county.

Members of Parliament

1295–1640

1640–1832
 1640 (Apr): Edmund Dunch (Parliamentarian); Unton Croke
 1640 (Nov): Edmund Dunch; Thomas Howard (Royalist) – disabled to sit, January 1644
 1645: Edmund Dunch ;Robert Packer – excluded in Pride's Purge, December 1648
 1648: Edmund Dunch (one seat only)
 1653: Wallingford not represented in Barebones Parliament
 1654: Wallingford not represented in first Protectorate Parliament
 1656: Wallingford not represented in second Protectorate Parliament
 1659: William Cook; Walter Bigg

 Constituency reduced to one seat, (1832)

1832–1885

Constituency abolished (1885)

Elections
Electoral system: The block vote electoral system was used in two seat elections and first past the post for single member elections. Each voter had up to as many votes as there were seats to be filled. Votes had to be cast by a spoken declaration, in public, at the hustings (until the secret ballot was introduced in 1872).

Percentage change calculations: Where there was only one candidate of a party in successive elections, for the same number of seats, change is calculated on the party percentage vote. Where there was more than one candidate, in one or both successive elections for the same number of seats, then change is calculated on the individual percentage vote.

Sources (unless otherwise indicated): (1754–1784) Namier and Brooke; (1790–1831) Stooks Smith; (1832–1880) Craig. Where Stooks Smith gives additional information or differs from the other sources this is indicated in a note after the result.

Swing: Positive swing is from Whig/Liberal to Tory/Conservative. Negative swing is from Tory/Conservative to Whig/Liberal.

Elections in the 1750s and 1760s

 Death of Hervey

 Creation of Pigot as the 1st Baron Pigot in the Peerage of Ireland, 1766

Elections in the 1770s and 1780s
 Seat vacated on the appointment of Pigot as Warden of the Mint

 Seat vacated on the appointment of Aubrey as a Lord of the Admiralty 2 

 Seat vacated on the appointment of Aubrey to an office

 Seat vacated on the appointment of Aubrey as a Commissioner of the Treasury 2 

 Note (1784 by-election): Namier and Brooke do not include this by-election, which is noted in Stooks Smith's book. Stooks Smith does not include the previous by-election won by Aubrey.

Elections in the 1790s

 Resignation of Wraxall

Elections in the 1800s

 Death of Sykes

Elections in the 1810s

Elections in the 1820s

 Resignation of Robarts

Elections in the 1830s

 Creation of Hughes as the 1st Baron Dinorben

 Note (1832): Blackstone used crimson and white colours and Eyston used green.

 Note (1835): Stooks Smith gives the registered electors as 344.

 Note (1837): Stooks Smith gives the registered electorate as 322. Blackstone used crimson and white colours and Teed used light blue.

Elections in the 1840s

Elections in the 1850s

Elections in the 1860s

Elections in the 1870s
 Death of Vickers

Elections in the 1880s

 Election declared void on petition

 Constituency abolished (1885)

Notes:-
 1 A Peer of Ireland. 
 2 This is the office attributed to the MP by Stooks Smith. However Pigot in 1772 does not appear on the Wikipedia list of Masters of the Mint.

Notes

References

Sources

British Parliamentary Election Results 1832–1885, compiled and edited by F.W.S. Craig (The Macmillan Press 1977)
 J. K. Hedges, Wallingford History (London: Wm Clowes, 1881)
 Sir Lewis Namier and John Brooke, The House of Commons 1754–1790, (London: HMSO, 1964)
 Robert Henry O'Byrne The representative history of Great Britain and Ireland, comprising biographical and genealogical notices of the Members of Parliament from Edward VI 1547 to Victoria 1847. (London, John Ollivier, 1848)
 T. H. B. Oldfield, The Representative History of Great Britain and Ireland (London: Baldwin, Cradock & Joy, 1816)
 J Holladay Philbin, Parliamentary Representation 1832 – England and Wales (New Haven: Yale University Press, 1965)

 M. Stenton (ed.), Who's Who of British Members of Parliament: Volume I 1832–1885 (The Harvester Press, 1976)

 Frederic A Youngs, "Guide to the Local Administrative Units of England, Vol I" (London: Royal Historical Society, 1979)

External links 
Wallingford History Gateway

Constituencies of the Parliament of the United Kingdom established in 1295
Constituencies of the Parliament of the United Kingdom disestablished in 1885
Rotten boroughs
Parliamentary constituencies in Oxfordshire (historic)
Parliamentary constituencies in Berkshire (historic)
Wallingford, Oxfordshire
Members of Parliament for Wallingford